is a railway station on the East Japan Railway Company (JR East) Tsugaru Line located in the city of Aomori, Aomori Prefecture, Japan.

Lines

Station layout
Okunai Station has a dual opposed side platforms serving two tracks. The platforms are short, and a door cut system is used for trains longer than 5 carriages long. The station is unattended.

Platforms

History
Okunai Station was opened on December 5, 1951 as a station on the Japanese National Railways (JNR). It became unattended from 1961–1987. In 1968, freight operations were suspended. With the privatization of the JNR on April 1, 1987, it came under the operational control of JR East. The station building burned down in a fire in November 1999 and the present building was completed in March 2000. The station has been unattended again since 2001.

Route bus
Okunai-eki-mae bus stop
Aomori municipal Bus
For.Ushirogata via Hidariseki
For.Furukawa via Jyusannmori(Aburakawa) and Okidate

Surrounding area
Kita Junior High School
Okunai Elementary School

See also
 List of railway stations in Japan

External links

 

Stations of East Japan Railway Company
Railway stations in Aomori Prefecture
Tsugaru Line
Aomori (city)
Railway stations in Japan opened in 1951